The 2019 Gamba Osaka season was Gamba Osaka's 26th season in the J1 League and 32nd overall in the Japanese top flight.  It saw them compete in the 18 team J1 League as well as the J.League Cup and Emperor's Cup competitions.

Transfers

Prior to the end of 2018, Gamba completed the signing of Kwansei Gakuin University fullback, Ryu Takao, who impressed in his side's shock win over Gamba in the Emperor's Cup in June.   He was joined by young midfielder Kohei Okuno, who signed a full-time deal after spending 2 years with Gamba's Under-23 side in J3 League.   It was also announced that Kansai University left-back Keisuke Kurokawa would join the club as a designated special player before signing permanently once he concluded his university studies in 2020.

Roasso Kumamoto wide midfielder / wing-back, Tatsuya Tanaka was next to join, having performed well in a team that was relegated from J2 the previous season.   Central midfielder Shinya Yajima returned from a loan spell with Vegalta Sendai where he spent the second half of the 2018 campaign while forward Hiroto Goya came back from J2 side Tokushima Vortis having only played 7 games due to injury.   Goalkeeper Ken Tajiri also returned to the club following an 18-month loan spell with Zweigen Kanazawa.

In a surprise move, defender Naoyaki Aoyama joined the club following 4 seasons in Thailand with Muangthong United.   Aoyama previously played with Shimizu S-Pulse, Yokohama F. Marinos and Ventforet Kofu in Japan.   After his country's elimination from the 2019 AFC Asian Cup it was announced that South Korean defender Kim Young-gwon would sign from Chinese club Guangzhou Evergrande.   He previously had spells in Japan with FC Tokyo and Omiya Ardija between 2010 and 2012.

At half time of the week 3 J.League fixture at home to Nagoya Grampus, it was announced that Spanish winger David Concha would join the club on loan from Real Sociedad.   He was handed the number 11 jersey.

In mid-December, it was announced that defenders Fabio and Takaharu Nishino as well as midfielders Naoya Senoo and Yuto Mori had been released.   Fabio played 31 times in J1 League during 2018, however Nishino, Senoo and Mori spent the majority of the season with Gamba U-23 in J3.   Later on in December versatile full-back Ryo Hatsuse left for Vissel Kobe, he had filled in at left back during Hiroki Fujiharu's injury during the previous season but saw out the campaign playing J3 football with Gamba U-23.   Attacking midfielder Haruya Ide left for J2 outfit, Montedio Yamagata, after 2 indifferent seasons in Osaka while young Korean defender Bae Soo-yong was again loaned out, this time to J3 side Kamatamare Sanuki.   Giant forward Shun Nagasawa, who spent the second half of 2018 on loan at Vissel Kobe, left permanently for Vegalta Sendai at the end of December.   On the same day, it was also announced that the versatile So Hirao, who had been with Avispa Fukuoka on loan in 2018 had signed a permanent deal with J2 side Machida Zelvia.

The beginning of 2019 brought with it the surprising news that attacking midfielder Jin Izumisawa, who'd spent the second half of 2018 on loan at J2 side Tokyo Verdy, would take the next step in his career in Poland with Pogoń Szczecin.   A couple of days later it was announced that 4th choice goalkeeper, Ryota Suzuki, would join J2 side JEF United Chiba on a season-long loan.   On the same day, promising forward Kazunari Ichimi, who was top scorer for Gamba U-23 in 2017 and 2018 joined Kyoto Sanga on loan for 2019.   Club legend Takahiro Futagawa finally departed the club permanently in mid January.   The 38 year-old had spent the previous 2 seasons out on loan in J2 with Tokyo Verdy and Tochigi.

Early on in the season young forward Hiroto Goya, who found himself well down the pecking order for a starting berth, was loaned out to J2 side V-Varen Nagasaki while Gamba U-23 captain Mizuki Ichimaru headed to FC Gifu on loan at the beginning of May.  At the end of May another Gamba U-23 stalwart, centre-back Hiroki Noda also left on loan, this time to J2 outfit Montedio Yamagata.

Gamba kicked off the summer transfer window with the announcement that attacking midfielder Takashi Usami would return for a third spell at the club.   The 27-times capped Japanese international had spent the 2018-2019 European season on loan at Bundesliga side Fortuna Düsseldorf on loan from Augsburg.   Right-sided midfielder Yuto Suzuki also came in on loan from Kawasaki Frontale in mid-July and his arrival was followed by the loan signing of Patric from Sanfrecce Hiroshima.   The striker previously enjoyed 4 seasons with Gamba and scored 9 times in their title-winning season in 2014.   Continuing the theme of returns, midfielder Yosuke Ideguchi also rejoined the club after an injury plagued 18 months in Europe.   The following week, Renofa Yamaguchi attacker, Daisuke Takagi, became the fifth arrival of the summer.

In terms of summer departures, veteran full-back Oh Jae-suk left on loan to once again link up with former Gamba head-coach Kenta Hasegawa at FC Tokyo.  Wing back Tatsuya Tanaka also left for fellow J1 side Oita Trinita, a mere 7 months after joining Gamba from Roasso Kumamoto.   A few days later Korean forward Hwang Ui-jo departed for Bordeaux in France and he was followed out the exit door the following day by veteran attacking midfielder Jungo Fujimoto who joined J2 promotion chasers Kyoto Sanga on loan until the end of the season.  Youngster Keito Nakamura who'd recently broken into the team playing on the left side of midfield earned a 2-year loan move to Dutch side FC Twente in mid July following in the footsteps of Ritsu Doan who joined Groningen in the Netherlands two years previously.   The exodus continued when veteran midfielder Yasuyuki Konno, who had fallen out of favour in 2019, moved to J1 rivals Jubilo Iwata on a permanent deal.   Young striker Akito Takagi, who bagged 11 goals in just 17 J3 games for Gamba U23 joined former team-mate Hiroki Noda on loan at J2 side Montedio Yamagata.   A few days later, right full-back Koki Yonekura returned to his former club, JEF United Chiba, on loan until the end of the season.   Young attacker Ryotaro Meshino later made the surprise move to English side Manchester City on a permanent deal and the following week central-midfielder, Takahiro Ko, joined J2 outfit Renofa Yamaguchi on loan until the end of the season.

In

Out

Coaching staff

The Coaching Staff for the 2019 J1 League season;

First team squad
Appearances and goals as of the beginning of the 2019 season.

* indicates player returned to Gamba Osaka from a loan spell with this club.

J1 League

On 11 January, Gamba's first 2 fixtures for the season were announced, at home to Yokohama F. Marinos and away to Shimizu S-Pulse. The dates for the remaining games were revealed on 23 January.

* = all times Japan Standard Time.

Match Day Line-Ups

The following players appeared for Gamba Osaka during the 2019 J1 League:

 = Substitute on,  = Substitute Off,  = Number of goals scored,  = Yellow Card and  = Red Card.

Emperor's Cup

Gamba entered the 2019 Emperor's Cup at the 2nd round stage where they were drawn at home to J3 League side Kamatamare Sanuki on 3 July.   A 7-1 thrashing of the Kagawa-based outfit set up a 3rd round tie with Hosei University who saw off J2 side Tokyo Verdy in the previous round.  For the second year in a row Gamba were defeated by university opposition as the students recorded a 2–0 win in Tokyo.

Match Day Line-Ups

  = Substitute on,  = Substitute Off,  = Number of goals scored,  = Yellow Card and  = Red Card.

J.League Cup

On 23 January, Gamba's fixtures for the group stage of the 2019 J.League Cup were announced. Gamba were drawn alongside fellow J1 clubs; Jubilo Iwata, Matsumoto Yamaga and Shimuzu S-Pulse and after accumulating 11 points from 6 games they topped their group and reached the playoff round where they were paired with J2 League side V-Varen Nagasaki.   A 4–1 victory in the first leg away from home ended the tie as a contest and although Nagasaki snatched a 2–0 win at the Panasonic Stadium it wasn't enough and Gamba progressed to the quarter-finals where they were paired with FC Tokyo.   A 1–0 home win preceded a 2-1 reverse in the second leg and meant Gamba headed to the semi-finals on the away goals rule.   In the last 4 they were drawn against Hokkaido Consadole Sapporo.   Gamba followed up a 5–0  win in the league 5 days previously with a 2–1 home leg victory, however this time they were the ones eliminated by the away goals rule as Musashi Suzuki's thunderbolt in the second leg in Sapporo sent Consadole through to their first ever final against Kawasaki Frontale.

* = all times Japan Standard Time.

Match Day Line-Ups

  = Substitute on,  = Substitute Off,  = Number of goals scored,  = Yellow Card and  = Red Card.

Squad statistics

Statistics accurate as of match played 7 December 2019

Goalscorers

Assists

Gamba Osaka Under-23

Gamba Osaka's Under-23 side compete in the J3 League where they are allowed to name 3 overage players of which one must be a goalkeeper.   On January 11, their opening home and away fixtures for the 2019 J3 League season were announced against Vanraure Hachinohe and Azul Claro Numazu.   The schedule for the remaining games was announced on January 23.

* = all times Japan Standard Time.

U-23 Squad statistics

Statistics accurate as of match played 8 December 2019

* = all times Japan Standard Time.

References

Gamba Osaka
Gamba Osaka seasons